San Michele al Tagliamento is an Italian Municipality with 11,930 inhabitants in the Metropolitan City of Venice, Veneto, Italy.

SS14, one of the main State Highways (Italy), passes through the commune, whose frazione of Bibione is a popular tourist resort. 
 
The neighboring municipalities are Caorle, Fossalta di Portogruaro, Latisana, Lignano Sabbiadoro, Morsano al Tagliamento, Portogruaro, Ronchis and Varmo.

History 

The first traces of human settlement date back to the 4th and 3rd centuries BC, when the area (now part of the municipality of San Michele al Tagliamento) was populated by the Adriatic Veneti.

From 181 AC onward, the Romans' colonization marked the beginning of the land reclamation and agricultural development of the entire area. Since the end of the 18th century, archaeological excavations have led to the discovery of black and white mosaic floors, copper coins, glass fragments and pottery, which can be traced back to the Roman imperial period.

Sources

External links

 everything about San Michele al Tagliamento portal with all type of info about San Michele al Tagliamento
 Bibione - tourist information

Cities and towns in Veneto